Thomas Schatz may refer to:

Thomas A. Schatz, president of Citizens Against Government Waste
Thomas Rivera Schatz (born 1966), Puerto Rican politician